16 Down (sometimes stylized as 16Down) is an alternative pop rock band from Zwolle, Netherlands founded in 1997. The band has released three albums and had three charting singles.

History
After Erwin Nyhoff, the only original member left in the Dutch band Prodigal Sons, decided to go solo under the name Prodigal Son in late 1996, the remaining members Jeroen Hobert, Marco Hovius and Arjan Pronk formed the band After Dust, later renaming themselves 16 Down.

In March 2001, the release of the single "Subtle Movements" earned the band media attention and chart success in The Netherlands and a spot at Lowlands 2001, a 3-day festival with over 57,000 tickets sold. Their debut album Headrush and its second single "Heaven Still Cries" followed, garnering more chart success for the band. The album's third single "If The Money's Right" featured guest vocals by Rudeboy of Urban Dance Squad and was used by Pepsi in a television commercial.

In 2002, 16 Down participated in the Marlboro Flashback Tour series, performing a full set of Radiohead songs in a number of cities across the Netherlands.

In the spring of 2003, 16 Down joined Anouk on her sold-out 17-date tour for her album Graduated Fool, followed by performances at the Parkpop and Bospop festivals that summer.

Before the release of the band's sophomore album, founding members Hobert ("for personal reasons") and Pronk left the band, both later performing with The Horse Company.

Life in a Fishbowl was preceded by the release of its lead single "The Day That I Met You" before being released in October 2003.

16 Down's third album F.L.O. was released at Paradiso in Amsterdam in 2007. A tour of 60 concerts followed in 2008 and 2009.

In 2011, frontman Marco Hovius built his own studio using money he made re-singing a Beck's Beer advertising song. There, he records and produces his own and other bands' music.

Discography
Albums

Singles

References

External links
 Official Facebook page

Swedish alternative rock groups
Musical groups established in 1997